Center Rock, Inc. is a manufacturer of drilling equipment headquartered in Berlin, Pennsylvania.  The company was founded in 1998 by Brandon W. Fisher.

Center Rock made headlines in 2002 when its equipment was instrumental in the Quecreek Mine Rescue in Pennsylvania, in which nine miners were rescued after being trapped for 78 hours in a flooded mine.

In 2010, Center Rock assisted in the rescue of 33 miners trapped for 69 days as a result of the  Copiapó mining accident in Chile.  The company provided a special hammer bit for the drill that enabled a rescue shaft to be completed much faster than originally anticipated.

References

External links
Company site
Low-profile Drill

Construction equipment manufacturers of the United States
Mining equipment companies
Companies based in Somerset County, Pennsylvania
Manufacturing companies established in 1998
2010 Copiapó mining accident
American companies established in 1998
1998 establishments in Pennsylvania
Manufacturing companies based in Pennsylvania
Privately held companies based in Pennsylvania